Staphylococcus borealis is a bacterial species, member of the genus Staphylococcus, closely-related to Staphylococcus haemolyticus and described in 2020. Its cells are Gram positive, coccoid in shape, with a diameter of 0.65 to 1.23 µm and form clusters. Additionally, they are facultative anaerobic, coagulase negative and catalase positive. The type strain (51-48T = CCUG 73747T = CECT 30011T) was isolated from human blood culture at the University Hospital of North Norway (Tromsø, Norway), in 1997. Four additional strains included in the description were isolated from skin swabs, from healthy volunteers. The genome sequence of the type strain is deposited in DNA Data Bank of Japan, European Nucleotide Archive and GenBank under the accession number JABVEJ000000000.

Additionally, three publicly available draft genome sequences were also identified as members of Staphylococcus borealis, two of them of strains isolated from cattle in Canada and one of a strain isolated from human skin, in Denmark.

References

borealis
Gram-positive bacteria
Bacteria described in 2020